Dimitrie Anghel (July 16, 1872 – November 13, 1914) was a Romanian poet.

Anghel was of Aromanian descent from his father. His first poem was published in Contemporanul (1890). His debut editorial Traduceri din Paul Verlaine was published in 1903 and in 1905 he published a volume of his works in În grădină, and in 1909, in Fantazii.

Notable poems, many of which were in collaboration with Ștefan Octavian Iosif, include Legenda funigeilor (dramatic poem, 1907), Cometa (comedy, 1908), Caleidoscopul lui A. Mirea (1908), Carmen saeculare (historical poem, 1909), published in 1910, Cireșul lui Lucullus (proză).

Around 1911 later in life he developed an interest in prose and published  Povestea celor necăjiți (1911), Fantome (1911), Oglinda fermecată (1912), Triumful vieții (1912) and Steluța (1913).

He fell in love with Iosif's wife Natalia Negru, who left her husband and divorced him. Anghel and Negru married in November 1911. In the autumn of 1914, during a quarrel, Anghel fired a warning shot at Negru, lightly wounding her. Believing he had killed her, he shot himself in the chest. The resulting wound became infected, and he died of sepsis two weeks later. Anghel was buried at Eternitatea Cemetery where at the funeral, an unknown female reportedly shouted, "You miserable woman, who kills all the country's great people!" to his widow Negru.

Notes

External links
 Poezii de Dimitrie Anghel la Cercul Poeților Dispăruți
 Biografie Dimitrie Anghel

1872 births
1914 suicides
People from Iași County
Romanian people of Aromanian descent
Romanian male poets
Suicides by firearm in Romania
Deaths from sepsis
Burials at Eternitatea cemetery
19th-century Romanian poets
20th-century Romanian poets
19th-century male writers
20th-century Romanian male writers